Streptomyces radiopugnans is a halotolerant and radiation resistant bacterium species from the genus of Streptomyces which has been isolated from radiation polluted soil from the Xinjiang Province in China.

See also 
 List of Streptomyces species

References

Further reading

External links
Type strain of Streptomyces radiopugnans at BacDive -  the Bacterial Diversity Metadatabase

radiopugnans
Bacteria described in 2007